Shane Pickett (born 1957, Quairading, Western Australia. Died 15 January 2010, Perth, Western Australia) was one of the foremost Nyoongar artists. Combining his deep knowledge and concern for Nyoongar culture with a confident and individual style of gestural abstraction, Pickett created paintings that resonated with a profound but subtle immediacy. Balancing innovation with tradition, modernity with an ancient spirituality, Pickett created a complex visual metaphor for the persistence of Nyoongar culture against the colonising tide of modernity. During his career, Pickett was selected as a finalist in numerous major art prizes including the Telstra National Aboriginal and Torres Strait Islander Art Award, for which he won the 'Best Painting in a European Medium' category prize in 1986. In 2006 he was awarded first prizes at the Sunshine Coast Art Prize and the Joondalup Invitation Art Award, and in 2007 he was awarded the major prize at the inaugural Drawing Together Art Award. He has exhibited in every state and territory in Australia, as well as in the United States, Europe, Africa and Asia. His works are held in major private and public collections throughout Australia and internationally.

Pickett died suddenly in Perth, Western Australia on 15 January 2010.

Collections

Art Gallery of Western Australia, Perth.
Museum and Art Gallery of the Northern Territory, Darwin
National Gallery of Australia, Canberra
National Gallery of Victoria, Melbourne
Western Australian Museum, Perth
Australian Institute of Aboriginal and Torres Strait Islander Studies, Canberra
Berndt Museum of Anthropology, University of Western Australia
BHP Collection, Western Australia
Burswood Collection, Western Australia
Caloundra Regional Art Gallery, Queensland
Charles Darwin University, Northern Territory
City of Fremantle Collection, Western Australia
City of Joondalup Collection, Western Australia
City of Stirling Collection, Western Australia
City of Wanneroo Collection, Western Australia
Edith Cowan University, Western Australia
Flinders University Art Museum, Adelaide, South Australia
Holmes a Court Collection, Western Australia
King Edward Memorial Hospital, Western Australia
Nillumbik Shire Council Art Collection, Greensborough, Victoria
Rockhampton City Art Gallery, Rockhampton
Royal Perth Hospital, Western Australia
Sir Charles Gardiner Hospital Collection, Western Australia
Subiaco Museum, Subiaco, Western Australia
Swinburne University of Technology, Victoria
Woodside Energy Ltd. Collection, Western Australia

References 
Winmar, A. 1990, 'Shane Pickett', Artlink, Vol. 10, Nos. 1 & 2, 1990.
Croft, B. 2003, South West Central: Indigenous Art from South West Australia 1833–2002, Art Gallery of Western Australia, Perth.
Smith, N. 2005, 'Dreamtime Believer', Insite Autumn 2005, Perth.
Mclean, I. 2006, 'Dreaming Painting: Shane Pickett', exhib. cat, PICApress, Perth.
Pushman, T. and Smith Walley, R. 2006,  Koorah Coolingah: Children Long Ago, Berndt Museum of Anthropology, Perth.
Skerritt, H. 2006, 'Kaanarn: True', exhib. cat. The Mossenson Galleries, Perth.
Dufour, G. 2006, 'Shane Pickett: Smart Art', Australian Art Collector, July–September 2006, Sydney.
Tapper, N. 2009, 'A Little-known Place: The Art of Shane Pickett', Art Monthly Australia, June 2009, Issue 220, Canberra.

Footnotes 

 Bevis, S. 2010, 'Service Honours Pickett', 'The West Australian', Perth, 22 January 2010, 

1957 births
Australian Aboriginal artists
Australian painters
2010 deaths
People from the Wheatbelt (Western Australia)
Noongar people